Stan Stamper Municipal Airport  is a city-owned, public-use airport located two nautical miles (3.7 km) northwest of the central business district of Hugo, a city in Choctaw County, Oklahoma, United States. According to the FAA's National Plan of Integrated Airport Systems for 2009–2013, it is classified as a general aviation airport.

Although many U.S. airports use the same three-letter location identifier for the FAA and IATA, this airport is assigned HHW by the FAA and HUJ by the IATA.

Facilities and aircraft 
It has one runway designated 17/35 with an asphalt surface measuring 4,007 by 75 feet (1,221 x 23 m).

For the 12-month period ending June 26, 2008, the airport had 1,250 aircraft operations, an average of 104 per month: 96% general aviation and 4% military. At that time there were 13 aircraft based at this airport: 92% single-engine and 8% helicopter.

References 

The Hugo city council named the airport after Stan Stamper, a local newspaper publisher, who served for 18 years as a member of the Oklahoma Aeronautics Commission. Stamper (1953-) is an accomplished aviator, with multiple aviation ratings including: Commercial, Instrument, multi-engine, and Flight Instructor ratings. He was named Aviator of the Year in Oklahoma in 1997.
Stamper was named to the Oklahoma Journalism Hall of Fame in 2012.

External links 
 Stan Stamper Municipal Airport (HHW) page at the Oklahoma Aeronautics Commission Airport Directory
 Aerial photo as of 16 March 1996 from USGS The National Map
 

Airports in Oklahoma
Buildings and structures in Choctaw County, Oklahoma